Ivan Maistrenko (1899–1984) was a Ukrainian revolutionary. He became a communist partisan during the Ukrainian Civil War of 1918–1920. He became a journalist and by 1921 was deputy director of the All-Ukrainian Communist Institute of Journalism. As an opponent of Joseph Stalin he was arrested but survived the gulag becoming  a post-war refugee in West Germany. During the Nazi Germany occupation, in 1942 Maisternko was a director of Ukrainian Bandurist Chorus in Kiev.

He was a prominent member of the Ukrainian Revolutionary Democratic Party and edited their anti-Stalinist workers paper Vpered. He also wrote a book Borotbism about the movement of that name.

References

1899 births
1984 deaths
People from Poltava Oblast
People from Zenkovsky Uyezd
Ukrainian Socialist-Revolutionary Party politicians
Borotbists
Communist Party of the Soviet Union members
Ukrainian Communist Party politicians
Ukrainian communists
Ukrainian revolutionaries
Russian Revolution in Ukraine